International School of Dongguan (ISD) is an international school in Nancheng District, Dongguan, Guangdong, China. It serves levels Pre-Kindergarten through grade 12.

International school of Dongguan (ISD) is the first international school authorized by the Chinese Ministry of Education in Dongguan. ISD has been providing education since 2012, offering international education from pre-kindergarten to grade 12. 

ISD is accredited by the Western Association of Schools and Colleges (WASC), making it one of only 60 WASC-accredited international schools in all of China. Besides, ISD is an authorized IB World School offering IBDP to the students. ISD is a member of two regional professional organizations for international schools: Association of China and Mongolia International Schools (ACAMIS) and East Asia Regional Council of Overseas Schools (EARCOS).

Accreditation, Memberships, and Associations 
The International School of Dongguan is accredited, a member of, or associated with the following organizations:
 Western Association of Schools and Colleges (WASC)
 The International Baccalaureate Diploma Program (IBDP)
 National Council of Curriculum and Textbook Development (NCCT) 
 East Asia Regional Council of Schools (EARCOS)
 Association of China and Mongolia International Schools (ACAMIS)
 International School Services (ISS)

References

International schools in Guangdong
International Baccalaureate schools in China
2012 establishments in China
Educational institutions established in 2012
Education in Dongguan